Ethan Mao is a 2004 drama film written and directed by Quentin Lee.  It was shown at the AFI Film Festival on November 10, 2004, and the Hong Kong Lesbian and Gay Film Festival on December 10 of the same year.  The DVD was released in North America on September 20, 2005.

Plot
Ethan Mao (Jun Hee Lee) is a closeted gay teen who is kicked out of his house after his manipulative stepmother Sarah (Julia Nickson-Soul) finds a gay pornographic magazine in his room and shows it to his traditionalist father.  On the street, Ethan is forced to become a hustler for money.  Soon, he meets Remigio (Jerry Hernandez), a teen hustler and drug dealer, and the two become friends and live together.

Ethan and Remigio plan to go to Ethan's old home over the Thanksgiving holiday (when Ethan knows everyone will be away visiting other family) to get money, some old belongings, and Ethan's deceased mother's necklace—which he feels is the only thing he has to remember her by.  But when the family returns to the house to pick up a forgotten gift—while Ethan and Remigio are inside—they feel forced to take everyone hostage.

The plan is to hold Ethan's father Abraham, Sarah, bullying stepbrother Josh (Kevin Kleinberg), and younger brother Noel in the home until the next day when the banks open and Sarah can go to the safety deposit box and retrieve Ethan's mother's necklace.  Everything goes smoothly until Sarah leaves for the bank and decides to call the police.

As the police surround the house, Ethan and Remigio are forced to make a choice about how everything will come to an end. They decide to walk out together and give themselves up to the police. After they kiss, the film cuts to them on bed together without lights on. Remigio asks Ethan to "let [him] know" when Ethan falls in love with anyone "no matter where [Remigio is]". Ethan responds positively that, if he falls in love with anyone, he will make Remigio the first person to kiss.

Cast
Jun Hee Lee as Ethan Mao
Raymond Ma as Abraham Mao
Julia Nickson-Soul as Sarah Mao
Kevin Kleinberg as Josh
Jerry Hernandez as Remigio
David Tran as Noel Mao

External links
 
 Ethan Mao review
 Movie review / Interview with Quentin Lee

2004 LGBT-related films
2004 psychological thriller films
2004 films
American LGBT-related films
Canadian LGBT-related films
Films about Chinese Americans
English-language Canadian films
LGBT-related films about Chinese Americans
2000s English-language films
2000s American films
2000s Canadian films